First Vienna FC is an Austrian association football club based in the Döbling district of Vienna. Established on 22 August 1894, it is the country's oldest team and has played a notable role in the history of the game there. It is familiarly known to Austrians by the English name Vienna.


History

In the early 1890s English and Austrian gardeners working for Nathaniel Anselm von Rothschild began to play football on his estates. To avoid further damage to his flowers Nathaniel ceded them a pasture nearby and also granted the team's blue-yellow kits, former jockey costumes of his riding stable. The Manx player William Beale designed the triskelion logo, also in the Rothschild colours blue and yellow, which Vienna still uses. The team played its first match on 15 November 1894 against the Vienna Cricket and Football-Club losing 0:4 to the club which would become a bitter longtime rival until the Cricketers''' football team was finally dissolved in 1936. The city of Vienna quickly became the centre of Austrian football and by the end of 1896 there were seven clubs playing there, several of which also fielded reserve sides.

In 1897, the chairman of the Cricketers donated the Challenge Cup establishing a competition open to all football clubs in what was then Austria-Hungary, drawing teams from Vienna, Budapest, and Prague. Cricket won the first cup competition in 1897, but First Vienna followed with consecutive cup titles in 1899 and 1900. The club also made a losing appearance in the 1907 final of the Wiener Cup which emerged when the Challenge Cup competition fell into disarray between 1903 and 1905. In the years leading up to the outbreak of the First World War in 1914 Vienna performed poorly and by 1915 had fallen out of first division play and did not return to the top flight until after the war in 1919.

Glory years
The club gradually returned to form and consistently finished in the top half of the league table through the 20s winning Austrian Cup titles in 1929 and 1930 before finally claiming the national championship in 1931. That same year the team also won the Mitropa Cup, one of Europe's first international club competitions. The cup title was unique in the history of the competition as they swept their opposition, winning all six of their matches. Vienna captured a second national title in 1933 with a third Austrian Cup following in 1937.

The team was involved in a failed attempt in the 1924–25 season to play Austria's first night game on a field lit by torches and flares, and playing with a ball covered in lime to make it more visible. They later successfully played the country's first match under floodlights on 3 November 1956.

WWII and play in the Gauliga
After Austria was united with Germany in the Anschluss in 1938 the football competitions of the two countries were also merged. First division Austrian teams played in the newly formed Gauliga Ostmark as part of the league structure established under the Third Reich in the re-organization of German football in 1933. This led to the appearance of Austrian sides in the national finals of Germany and in competition for the Tschammerpokal, predecessor of today's German Cup. In 1942, Vienna captured the divisional title in what was by then known as the Gauliga Donau-Alpenland (Ostmark) and went all the way to the final played on 4 July 1942 in Berlin where they dropped a 0:2 decision to Schalke 04 the dominant side of German football in the era. Vienna repeated as divisional champions the following season, but this time advanced only as far as the semi-finals before being put out 1:2 by FV Saarbrücken. The club did, however, have a successful Tschammerpokal run, winning the 1943 competition by defeating Luftwaffen-SV Hamburg 3:2 in extra time to become the second Austrian side to take the cup by following in the footsteps of Rapid Wien, victors in 1938. A third Gauliga title in 1944 again put the club into Germany's national playoffs where this time they went out 2:3 in the quarterfinals to eventual champions Dresdner SC. As World War II drew to a close and Allied armies advanced into Germany league play collapsed with Vienna still in a tight race again looking to repeat as division champions.

Postwar play
Occupied by Allied forces after the end of the war, Austria was once again independent of Germany and a separate league structure was re-established. In league play in the 1946 season Vienna earned only a fifth-place finish but did go on to capture the Liberation Cup donated by the Soviets.

Through the late 40s and on into the early 50s the club's performance was uneven as they generally earned only mid-table results. However, led by club legend Karl Koller, in 1955 Vienna enjoyed an excellent season that ended with the club's sixth national championship title as they finished ahead of Wiener Sport-Club since they had the better goal quotient. Goal difference was not yet implemented. A 1:0 was better than a 10:1 win, the higher the quotient the better, although the ideal one being zero (forced goals divided by allowed goals). 20:1= 20, 20:2=10, so the higher quotient, the better with the exception of zero. Example: when Vienna won the championship in the 1954–1955 season they ended up with 64:26 goals = 2.461 quotient. Wiener Sport-Club finished with 75: 40 goals, achieving a quotient of only 1.875 but on equal points (39).

Fall from the top flightVienna remained competitive through the balance of the decade, consistently finishing in the top three, but the club faded through the 60s until they were finally relegated in 1968 for the first time since their return to the top flight after World War I. They re-appeared in the first division after a single season absence, but no longer seriously challenged for the title. With the establishment of the ten-team Zehnerliga, Austria's new premier division, in 1974–75, Vienna again found itself playing second division football until earning promotion in 1976. However, they continued to struggle as a lower division side and were again sent down in 1980.

The expansion of the first division from ten to sixteen teams in 1982 allowed Vienna back into the senior competition, but their inconsistent play continued. Another league re-organization established the twelve-team Austrian Bundesliga in 1985 and Vienna made its first appearance there in the following season. A highlight of this time was a strong championship round performance in 1988 that led to a fourth-place finish that earned the club a UEFA Cup appearance. The club remained a lower table side and was facing relegation trouble by the early-90s, finally being sent down in 1992. Vienna next enjoyed a strong run through the 1997 Austrian Cup competition which took them to the final where they lost 2–1 to first division side Sturm Graz.

However, the team could not recover itself in regular league play, and while they came close to a return to the Bundesliga several times, they continued a slide that in 2000 landed them in the third division Regionalliga Ost where Vienna played until in 2009 they won the championship and gained promotion to the First League.

In the 2009/10 season, Vienna finished eleventh in the second tier of Austrian football. A potential relegation playoff against Regionalliga West champions SV Grödig were canceled because the relegated team FC Kärnten had its license withdrawn.  The following 2010/11 season, Vienna finished once again second-bottom in the league table ahead of SV Gratkorn. However, under new coach Alfred Tatar managed to win their relegation matches against the champions of the Regionalliga Ost, SC-ESV Parndorf 1919, 3-0 and 2-1 respectively, and maintained their second tier status.  The following year, Vienna secured their place in the league in the 36th match of the season and in the 2012/13 season, Vienna performed better, managing to keep away from the relegation battle with good performances and finished 7th.

The 2013/14 season was a disaster for Vienna, finishing last with a 13 point deducted due to various licensing violations. At the end of the season, Vienna and Tatar announced an amicable separation.  The club's license for the 2014/15 season in professional football was also denied. From the 2014/15 season, Vienna had to play in the third tier Regionalliga Ost again.

Due to the insolvency of the main sponsor Care-Energy, Vienna was declared bankrupt in 2017. While bankruptcy was averted, a championship title in the Regionalliga Ost in the same year was withheld. Promotion was denied and it got worse, with Vienna being transferred to the fifth division by court order. In the following season.

Lower leagues

In the 2018/19 season, Vienna played in the 2. Landesliga Wien, the fifth tier of the Austrian league system.  In their first season, Vienna'' finished top with 78 points from 30 games and were promoted to the fourth division, the Wiener Stadtliga.  They remained unbeaten in the league in the 2019/20 season after 17 games.  The league was abandoned due to the Covid-19 outbreak, meaning the club stayed in the Wiener Stadtliga for the 2020/21 season. However, at the end of season 2020-2021 Vienna was promoted once again to the third tier Regionalliga Ost.

Club of Pioneers

In 2018 First Vienna FC, became a member of the exclusive Club of Pioneers, as the oldest football club of Austria.

Stadium
The club's home venue is the Hohe Warte Stadium built in 1921 and having a current capacity of 5,500 spectators.

First Vienna FC in Europe

Current squad

Club staff

 Manager: Alexander Zellhofer
 Assistant Manager: Martin Lang
 Assistant Manager: Jiri Lenko
 Goalkeeping Coach: Patrick Kostner

Notable former players
Mario Kempes, (1986 - 1987) World Cup Winner and former Argentinian International
Alfred Drabits, (1988 - 1991) Former Austrian International
Zeljko Radovic, (1994 - 1997) Former Austrian International
Gary Noël, (2015 - 2016) Former Mauritius International
Turgay Bahadır (2015 - 2016) Former Turkish International
Markus Katzer, (2015 - 2020) Former Austrian International
Mensur Kurtisi, (2016 - 2021) Former Macedonian International
Ümit Korkmaz, (2019 - 2020) Former Austrian International

Honours
Austrian Champions (6): 1931, 1933, 1942, 1943, 1944, 1955
Austrian Cup (3): 1929, 1930, 1937
Austrian 2. Landesliga: Champions 2019
Austrian Regionalliga: Champions 2022
Challenge Cup (2): 1899, 1900
German Cup (1): 1943
Mitropa Cup (1): 1931
Liberation Cup (1): 1946
Tournoi de l'Exposition Coloniale (Paris-Vincennes) (1): 1931
Tournoi du Nouvel An du Red Star (1): 1924 (shared)
Tournoi de Nöel de Paris : Runners-up 1935

References

External links
 Official website 
 Historical Austrian league results
 Historical German league results 
 Soccerway profile

 
Association football clubs established in 1894
Football clubs in Vienna
Football clubs in Austria
Football clubs from former German territories
Döbling
1894 establishments in Austria